Turmanin is a town in northern Syria, administratively part of the Idlib Governorate, located north of Idlib. Nearby localities include al-Dana and Sarmada to the southwest, Darat Izza to the northeast and Atarib to the south. According to the Syria Central Bureau of Statistics, Turmanin had a population of 10,394 in the 2004 census.

The town is notable for the ruins of an ancient basilica in its vicinity. The Basilica, built around 480 AD, was an important influence on later church architecture, and operated as a monastery and a hospice that was noted for its care for the dying. Recently, the town came under the control of the Syrian National Army.

Climate
In Turmanin, the climate is warm and temperate. In winter there is much more rainfall in Turmanin than in summer.
According to Köppen and Geiger climate is classified as Csa.
The average annual temperature in Turmanin is 16.9 °C. The average annual rainfall is 459 mm.
The driest month is July with 0 mm. Most precipitation falls in January, with an average of 90 mm.
The warmest month of the year is August with an average temperature of 27.7 °C. In January, the average temperature is 6.0 °C. It is the lowest average temperature of the whole year.

Deir Turmanin: the Byzantine monastery

The ruins of the Byzantine monastery of Deir Turmanin (deir meaning 'monastery' in Arabic) are located northeast of the modern village. The monastery buildings stood around a paved courtyard containing two cisterns, a sarcophagus and several tombs. The ruins include a building that housed the monks' dormitories, and the large 5th-century basilica. The twin-towered facade of the church had a colonnade above the portal. The towers were three stories high and were roofed with gables. The church was probably donated by wealthy patrons. Evidence at the site suggests that the monks were involved in agricultural activity and kept livestock.

See also

Church of Saint Simeon Stylites
Dead Cities

References

Bibliography

Populated places in Harem District
Towns in Syria
Archaeological sites in Idlib Governorate
Syriac Christianity
Dead Cities